Poperechnaya Gora (Arqırıtaw) is a rural locality (a village) in Karayarsky Selsoviet, Karaidelsky District, Bashkortostan, Russia. The population was 21 as of 2010. There are 5 streets.

Geography 
Poperechnaya Gora is located 48 km southeast of Karaidel (the district's administrative centre) by road. Komsomolsky is the nearest rural locality.

References 

Rural localities in Karaidelsky District